The Federal Correctional Institution, Seagoville (FCI Seagoville) is a low-security United States federal prison for male inmates in Seagoville, Texas in the Dallas-Fort Worth metropolitan area. It is operated by the Federal Bureau of Prisons, a division of the United States Department of Justice. The facility includes a detention center for male offenders and an adjacent satellite prison camp that houses minimum security-male offenders.

History
The Federal Reformatory for Women in Seagoville opened on October 10, 1940. After the attack on Pearl Harbor, the government converted the center into a Federal Detention Station, monitored by the Immigration and Naturalization Service, that housed people of Japanese, German and Italian descent who were classified as "enemy aliens," including women deported from Latin America into U.S. custody Many of the Latin American internees had been classified officially as "voluntary internees" because they had chosen to leave their home countries after their husbands had been deported to the U.S., however, their choice was in many cases motivated by the difficulties of supporting themselves and their families alone. Internees at Seagoville published a German language newsletter called the Sägedorfer Fliegende Blätter. Beginning in June 1943, the State Department arranged for the deportation of many of the internees to Japan and Germany, which helped decrease the population as authorities prepared to transfer the remaining detainees to Crystal City, Texas. Seagoville held a total of some 650-700 people, and was closed in June 1945.

After World War II ended, on June 25, 1945 the prison became a facility for minimum security male offenders. In 1969, the facility's mission changed to that of housing young male offenders sentenced under the Youth Corrections Act. At the time the maximum age of the prisoners was 27.

In 1979, the facility's mission changed into that of a Federal Prison Camp. In 1981, a perimeter fence was installed and the facility became a Federal Correctional Institution. The adjacent Federal Detention Center opened in 1996. FDC Seagoville celebrated its 60th anniversary on October 10, 2000.

Facility
The prison facility is located on an  tract. Built for $1.8 million, it occupies a portion of the acreage. In World War II single detainees occupied dormitories while couples resided in "Victory Huts", prefabricated one room buildings with measurements of  each.

Notable incidents
On November 8, 2012, 27-year-old John Hall, an inmate at FCI Seagoville, pleaded guilty to violating the Matthew Shepard and James Byrd Jr. Hate Crimes Prevention Act for assaulting a fellow inmate whom he believed to be gay. Hall admitted that on December 20, 2011, he repeatedly punched and kicked the victim, whom the Department of Justice did not identify, while calling the victim homosexual slurs. The victim sustained multiple lacerations to his face and fractured teeth as a result of Hall's unprovoked attack. On March 14, 2013, Hall was sentenced to an additional 71 months in prison for the attack, which is to be served consecutively.

Notable inmates (current and former)

COVID-19 outbreak
On August 8, 2020, CNN reported that 1,300 of the 1,750 prisoners (75% of the inmates) have tested positive for COVID-19.Twenty-eight of the 300 staff members have tested positive as well. , three inmates have died. "It came through here so fast that it's out of control," said inmate Bobby Williams, who contracted the virus in June. "We're packed like sardines."

See also 

List of U.S. federal prisons
Federal Bureau of Prisons
Incarceration in the United States

References

External links

Map of BOP Prisons
BOP: FCI Seagoville

Buildings of the United States government in Texas
Federal Correctional Institutions in the United States
Prisons in Texas
Buildings and structures in Dallas County, Texas
World War II internment camps in the United States
Women's prisons in Texas
1940 establishments in Texas